Donald Taylor Ritchie  (9 June 1926 – 13 May 2012) was an Australian who intervened in many suicide attempts. He officially rescued at least 180 people who had intended to attempt suicide at The Gap.

Early life 
Ritchie went to Vaucluse Public School and attended Scots College. He enlisted into the Royal Australian Navy on 30 June 1944 as a seaman aboard  and witnessed the unconditional surrender of the Japanese Imperial Forces in Tokyo Bay on 2 September 1945, officially ending World War II in the Pacific.

After the war, he was a life insurance salesman.

Intervention
Officially, he rescued 180 people from suicide as of 2009 over a 45-year period, although his family claims the number is closer to 500. Ritchie resided next to The Gap, a location in Sydney, Australia, known for multiple suicide attempts.  

Upon seeing someone on the cliff in distress, Ritchie would cross the road from his property and engage them in conversation, often beginning with the words, "Can I help you in some way?" Afterwards Ritchie would invite them back to his home for a cup of tea and a chat. Some of the people he helped would return years later to thank him for his efforts in talking them out of their decision.

Ritchie explained his intervention in suicide attempts saying, "You can't just sit there and watch them."

Awards
In 2006, he was awarded the Medal of the Order of Australia for his rescues, the official citation being for "service to the community through programs to prevent suicide". Ritchie and his wife Moya were also named "Citizens of the Year" for 2010 by Woollahra Council, the local government authority responsible for the Gap. He received Local Hero Award for Australia in 2011, the National Australia Day Council saying: "His kind words and invitations into his home in times of trouble have made an enormous difference... With such simple actions, Don has saved an extraordinary number of lives."

Death
Ritchie died on 13 May 2012, age 86. He is survived by his wife Moya and their three daughters.

See also
 Suicide prevention
 Chen Si
 Kevin Briggs
 Yukio Shige

References

Recipients of the Medal of the Order of Australia
1926 births
2012 deaths
Suicide prevention
Australian Anglicans
Suicide in Australia
Royal Australian Navy personnel of World War II
Royal Australian Navy sailors